Weir is an unincorporated community located in Muhlenberg County, Kentucky, United States.

History
A post office called Weir was established in 1894, and remained in operation until 1915. The community was named in honor of a family of early settlers.

Country music singer Guy Drake was born in Weir.

References

Unincorporated communities in Muhlenberg County, Kentucky
Unincorporated communities in Kentucky